They Were Sisters is a 1943 novel by the British writer Dorothy Whipple. Three sisters marry shortly after the First World War and experience wildly differing experiences of family life over the next twenty years.

Film adaptation
In 1945 it was adapted into a British film of the same title directed by Arthur Crabtree and starring James Mason, Phyllis Calvert, Dulcie Gray and Anne Crawford.

References

Bibliography
 Goble, Alan. The Complete Index to Literary Sources in Film. Walter de Gruyter, 1999.

1943 British novels
Novels by Dorothy Whipple
British novels adapted into films
Novels set in England
Novels set in the 1910s
Novels set in the 1930s
John Murray (publishing house) books